Ed Kashi (born 1957) is an American photojournalist and member of VII Photo Agency based in the Greater New York area. Kashi's work spans from print photojournalism to experimental film. He is noted for documenting sociopolitical issues.

Personal life
Kashi was born in New York City in 1957. He graduated from Syracuse University's S.I. Newhouse School of Public Communications in 1979 with a major in photojournalism.

He is married to Julie Winokur who is also a photographer and frequent collaborator.

Career
Kashi has worked with National Geographic Society since 1990 and worked in over 60 countries. His clients include: The New York Times Magazine, Time, Mediastorm, Ford Foundation, Robert Wood Johnson Foundation, GEO, Newsweek and msnbc.com.

Kashi has covered the plight of the Kurdish people and the impact of the oil industry upon the impoverished Niger Delta. He is known for his coverage of the Protestant community in Northern Ireland, the lives of Jewish settlers in the West Bank, and the strife between the Shiites and Sunnis in Iraq.

Kashi uses stills along with video and audio for storytelling purposes. His Iraqi Kurdistan flipbook premiered on msnbc.com in 2006. The flipbook utilizes thousands of stills in a moving image format, layered with music to create a symphonic documentary. The flipbook was included in Silverdocs film festival in 2007 and the Tiburon International Film Festival in 2008.

"Curse of the Black Gold, Hope and Betrayal in the Niger Delta", published in National Geographic in February 2007, chronicled the negative impact of oil development on the impoverished Niger Delta. This article led to a collaborative photographic and editorial essay book, Curse of the Black Gold: 50 Years of Oil in the Niger Delta (2008). Photojournalisms, his latest book is a compilation of journal writings to his wife, done over a nearly 20-year period. It was published in March 2012, by JGS/Nazraeli Press and was highlighted during an interview with Kashi for the New York Times Lens Blog.

In 2019, The Enigma Room an immersive installation, premiered at NYC's Photoville festival, and has since been seen in Israel, the Netherlands, South Korea, and New Mexico, U.S. The Enigma Room is an experimental multimedia projection created in collaboration with Brenda Bingham, Michael Curry, and Rachel Bolańos.

Kashi continues to teach and lecture at art institutes and universities. He has taught a class titled "New Frontiers in the Art of Visual Storytelling" at the Los Angeles Center of Photography (LACP).

Talking Eyes Media
Kashi and his wife, Julie Winokur, are co-founders of a non-profit multimedia company called Talking Eyes Media. Talking Eyes Media was created in 2002 to deliver issue-orientated stories to the general public. Some of the stories covered by Talking Eyes Media/Ed Kashi are: Aging in America, Denied: The Crisis of America's Uninsured and The Sandwich Generation. Aging in America was also the subject of a book, named by American Photo Magazine as one of the best photo books of 2003  and received awards from Pictures of the Year International, World Press Photo.

Publications

Publications by Kashi
No Surrender: The Protestants. Self-published, 1991 
When the Borders Bleed: The Struggle of the Kurds. Pantheon, 1994
Aging in America: The Years Ahead. Brooklyn: powerHouse, 2003
Denied: The Crisis of America's Uninsured. Talking Eyes, 2003
Curse of the Black Gold: 50 Years of Oil in the Niger Delta. Brooklyn: powerHouse, 2008
Three. Brooklyn: powerHouse, 2009
Madagascar: A Land Out of Balance. Prix Pictet, 2010
Photojournalisms. JGS: Witness #8. Portland, Oregon: Nazraeli, 2012
Abandoned Moments: A Love Letter to Photography. Germany Kehrer, 2021

Publications with others
Contatti. Provini d'Autore = Choosing the best photo by using the contact sheet. Vol. I. Edited by Giammaria De Gasperis. Rome: Postcart, 2012. .
Human Rights Watch: Struggling for a Humane World: Interviews / Ed Kashi: Sugar Cane | Syrian Refugees: Photographs. Göttingen: Steidl; Stuttgart: Institute for Foreign Cultural Relations, 2016. Edited by Ronald Grätz and Hans-Joachim Neubauer. . An annual publication by the Institute for Foreign Cultural Relations (IFA), this year about Human Rights Watch (HRW). In it HRW executive director Kenneth Roth, Zama Coursen-Neff, executive director of the Children's Rights Division at HRW, and George Soros discuss the work of HRW. Kashi's photo-essays on Syrian Refugees and on chronic kidney disease among sugar cane workers in Central America illustrate the topic.
 Kurdistan: In the Shadow of History (second edition), edited by Susan Meiselas. University Chicago Press. 2008 
 Visions of Paradise National Geographic. 2008.
 What Matters: The World's Preeminent Photojournalists and Thinkers Depict Essential Issues of Our Time, David Elliot Cohen. 2008.
 In Focus: National Geographic Greatest Portraits, National Geographic. 2010.
Photo No-Nos: Meditations on What Not to Photograph. Edited by Jason Fulford. New York: Aperture. 2021. .

Awards

2008: Special Jury Prize, Days Japan International Photojournalism Awards.
2006: Special Jury Prize, Days Japan International Photojournalism Awards.
2009: Shortlisted, Prix Pictet
2014: Pictures of the Year (POY): News & Issue Story Editing/Magazine 3rd Place: National Geographic - Northern Nigeria
2014: PDN Publisher's Choice Award: Syria's Lost Generation
2015: Pictures of the Year (POY): Multimedia Photographer of the Year 1st Place; Documentary Photojournalism 1st Place
2015: PDN Photo Annual: Video finalist: California: Paradise Burning
2015: Aaron Siskind Foundation: Winner: Individual Photographer's Fellowship Grant: CDKnT and Sugarcane workers
2015: Ai-AP 31: Unpublished Editorial News: Nicaragua
2016: Ai-AP 32: Editorial, Photojournalism: CKDnT and Ghana
2017: National Endowment for the Humanities Grant: Newest Americans
2017: National Geographic Society Explorer's Grant recipient for CKDnT project
2019: Berlin Short Film Festival Award of Excellence; Impact DOCS Awards Award of Excellence; Belfast Respect Human Rights Film Festival official selection: Hot Dogs on a Tricycle, a HomeStorytellers film
2019: Px3 State of the World/Social documentary exhibition winner: Chronic Kidney Disease (CKDnT)
2021: Pictures of the Year (POY), Documentary Daily Life, Second Place, "Sheila and Joe"; Online Storytelling Project of the Year, Newest Americans
2022: Px3 Book Photographer of the Year award for "Abandoned Moments"

References

External links

Talking Eyes Media
The Candid Frame Podcast Ep. 589 with Ed Kashi
Photography Techniques: Photojournalism Tips From Ed Kashi – 10 minute video

Living people
1957 births
American photojournalists
VII Photo Agency photographers
S.I. Newhouse School of Public Communications alumni
Syracuse University College of Visual and Performing Arts alumni